Nigel Buesst (born 30 April 1938) is an Australian filmmaker from Melbourne.  After graduating B.Com in 1960 from Melbourne University he headed overseas to London and worked as an assistant editor at Shepperton Studios.

On returning to Melbourne in 1962 he worked for some months at the ABC's Ripponlea newsroom, and freelanced as a cameraman on various productions. He also started directing his own films, beginning with “Fun Radio” in 1963.

After the success of his film "Rise and Fall of Squizzy Taylor"  he began teaching at the Swinburne University of Technology (1970-1984)  while continuing to make films on a diverse range of subjects. 

He was also a co-founder and the artistic director of the St Kilda Film Festival from 1986 to 1990. 

Buesst has been described as "a living legend of Melbourne's film scene"  and was a figure in the "Carlton wave" of Australian filmmaking.

Select credits
DIRECTOR on all titles, unless otherwise noted.
Fun Radio (1963)
Dancing Class (Dir: Tom Cowan 1964) – photography
The Twentieth (1966)
The Making of a Gallery, NGV (1967) – photography
The Rise and Fall of Squizzy Taylor (1969)
Nothing Like Experience (1970) – photography
Bonjour Balwyn (1970)
Dead Easy (1970)
Destruction of St Patrick's College (1971) 
Come Out Fighting (1973)
Jacka VC (Dir: Ross Cooper 1977) – photography
Glenn's Story (Dir: Arnold Zable 1979)  – photography
Jazz Scrapbook (1983) 
Compo (1989)
Benny Featherstone (Prince Good Fellows) (1996) 
Black Sheep Gather No Moss (1997) 
The Loved One - Gerry Humphrys (2000) 
Talking With Ade (2000) 
Carlton + Godard = Cinema (2003) 
Darwin Harbour (2010) 
Ballarat Jazz Convention (2015) 
Point Lonsdale Plaque Unveiling (2018)  – editor

References

External links

2003 Interview at Senses of Cinema
Nigel Buesst profile at Inner Sense
Tribute to Nigel Buesst
Nigel Buesst at Australian Screen Online
Nigel Buesst at Screen Australia
Nigel Buesst at AustLit
Nigel Buesst at Letterbox DVD
Nigel Buesst at BFI

Australian film directors
1938 births
Living people